Barkley is an English surname.  Notable people with the surname include:

Sports
Brian Barkley (born 1975), American baseball pitcher
Charles Barkley (born 1963), American basketball player
 David Barkley (born 1950), Australian Rules football player
Doug Barkley (born 1937), Canadian ice hockey defenceman and head coach
Erick Barkley (born 1978), American basketball player
Iran Barkley (born 1960), American boxer
Jeff Barkley (born 1959), American baseball pitcher
Lucille Barkley (1925–1979), American actress
Matt Barkley (born 1990), American football quarterback who plays in the National Football League
Noel Barkley (born 1961), footballer who represented New Zealand internationally
Olly Barkley (born 1981), English rugby player
Red Barkley (1912–2000), American baseball infielder
Ross Barkley (born 1993), English footballer
Sam Barkley (1858–1912), American baseball second baseman
Saquon Barkley (born 1997), American football player

Politics
Alben W. Barkley (1877–1956), 35th Vice President of the United States
Alexander Barkley (1817–1893), American politician from New York
Charles E. Barkley (born 1950), American politician from Maryland
Dean Barkley (born 1950), Senator from Minnesota
Jane Hadley Barkley (1911–1964), Second Lady of the United States, wife of Alben W. Barkley
Margaret Barkley, member of the Ohio House of Representatives
Richard Clark Barkley (born 1932), American diplomat

Military
David B. Barkley (1899–1918), American soldier during the First World War
John L. Barkley (1895–1966), American soldier during the First World War

Arts and entertainment
Brad Barkley, American writer
James Barkley, American artist
Roger Barkley (1936–1997), American radio personality

Other
Charles William Barkley (1759–1832), English ship's captain and fur trader
Frances Barkley, wife of Charles William Barkley, first woman to sail around the world without deception
Fred Alexander Barkley (1908–1989), American botanist
Russell Barkley, doctor of clinical psychology and ADHD researcher

See also
Charles Barkley (disambiguation)
Barkley (disambiguation)

English-language surnames